The Civil Aviation Safety and Security Oversight Agency (CASSOA) is an administrative agency of the East African Community (EAC), with headquarters in Entebbe, Uganda. CASSOA's responsibilities include airworthiness inspections of aircraft and airport facilities in the East African area of Kenya, Tanzania and Uganda. Rwanda, South Sudan, the Democratic Republic of the Congo and Burundi are currently merging their aviation bureaucracies with CASSOA. The agency is working with the Civil Aviation Authorities of the six member states to harmonise their aviation regulations, such that a licence acquired in one state should be valid in all of the others. The agency also organises training for member states.

See also
International Civil Aviation Organization

References

External links
CASSOA pages at the East African Community site

Aviation in Africa
Arusha
East African Community